Elizabeth Flynn Rodgers (August 25, 1847August 27, 1939) was an Irish-born American labor leader. One of the first women to hold an office in the Knights of Labor, Rodgers fought for women's rights in the workplace while raising her ten children. She led a small group of women to organize the Working Women's Union in the 1870s, the first labor union for women in Chicago. In her later years, she helped found a fraternal life insurance organization, the Women's Catholic Order of Foresters, leading the organization for over fifteen years.

Early life

Elizabeth Flynn was born in Woodford, Ireland on August 25, 1847. She was the daughter of Robert Flynn and Bridget (Campbell) Flynn. The family moved to Canada when Flynn was a child and she was raised and educated in London, Ontario.

As a young woman, she married socialist and union organizer George Rodgers. They both agitated for worker's rights and were blacklisted by companies, forcing them to move several times to find work. To make ends meet for their growing family, Rodgers took in boarders while George looked for work as an iron molder.

Work in labor organizing

The family settled in Chicago in the early 1870s and Rodgers took on more work in the labor movement along with her husband. Despite making up around 18% of the labor force, women were not initially welcome in the Knights of Labor. In response, in 1878 Rodgers led a small group of women to form the first woman's union in Chicago, the Working Women's Union. The WWU was made up primarily of non-wage earning women along with seamstresses and domestic servants, and its members included Lucy Parsons, Lizzie Swank, and Alzina Stevens. The union leadership worked to inform workers of their rights and joined the eight-hour day campaign.

In 1881 the Knights of Labor opened its membership to women. Rodgers was made a "Master Workman" (president) of District Assembly 24 in 1886, covering all of Chicago except the Stockyards. She was the first woman to hold that position in the Knights. Rodgers helped promote women's involvement in the Knights of Labor. 

Rodgers gave birth to ten children during her years of activism. She attended the Knights of Labor national convention in 1886 with her two-week-old baby, who The New York Times reported was the only non-delegate allowed in the meeting room. She was politically conservative, arguing that all Socialists were "good for is to agitate mischief". At the same time she was a dedicated feminist; when her husband asked her to resign her post, she said "knowing my duty to my sex, I thought it was an opportunity to show our brothers how false that theory is that women are not good for anything." Rodgers declined a nomination for the post of general treasurer, however, saying she could not effectively serve in that role while caring for her children.

Later life and death

In 1887, as the Knights of Labor declined in membership and power, Rodgers left the organization, becoming a partner in Leavell and Rodgers Printers from 1889 to 1892. 

She later went on to a career in insurance. Because the Catholic Order of Foresters did not permit women members, in 1891 she helped found the Women's Catholic Order of Foresters, allowing female workers to be covered by life insurance. She also served as the organization's leader, High Chief Ranger, until 1908. The Women's Catholic Order of Foresters eventually became well-established across the United States, providing financial protection for Catholic families. 

She died of a cerebral hemorrhage at the home of one of her daughters in Wauwatosa, Wisconsin, on August 27, 1939. She was buried at Mount Olivet Cemetery in Chicago.

References

1847 births
1939 deaths
American trade unionists of Irish descent
American women trade unionists
Irish emigrants to the United States
People from County Galway
Trade unionists from Illinois